Gujari (also spelt Gojri, Gujri, or Gojari) is an Indo-Aryan language spoken by some of the Gurjar (Gujjars) in the northern parts of India and Pakistan as well as in Afghanistan. It is a member of the Rajasthani group of languages.

In India, the language is spoken by 1.3 million people (as of 2011) in Jammu and Kashmir and Himachal Pradesh, with ethnic Gujjars elsewhere having shifted to the regional languages instead. In Pakistan, there are an estimated 400,000 speakers (as of 2018) in Azad Kashmir, in Gilgit-Baltistan (Diamer and Gilgit districts), in Khyber Pakhtunkhwa (the Hazara region, and northwest up to Chitral District), and in Rawalpindi District in northern Punjab. The population in Afghanistan is scattered, and numbers at 15,000 (according to a 2015 estimate).

The government of the erstwhile Indian state of Jammu and Kashmir had recognized Gujari by including it in the sixth schedule of the state constitution.

Literary traditions 
Gujari folklore is very large, including songs, ballads and folktales, known as Dastans. Hundreds of folk songs have been recorded and published, including "Nooro", "Tajo", "Nura Beguma", "Shupiya", "Kunjhdi", "Mariyan".

A modern tradition of creative writing encompasses poets such as Sain Qadar Bakhsh, Noon Poonchi, and others. Others such as Mian Nizam ud Din, Khuda Bakhsh Zar, Zabih Rajourvi, Shams ud Din Mehjoor Poonchi, Mian Bashir Ahmed, Javaid Rahi, Rafiq Anjum, Milki Ram Kushan, Sarwari Kassana, Naseem Poonchi have also made remarkable contributions to Gujari through poetry, prose and criticism.

Institutions and media 
All India Radio and Doordarshan Kendra run various Gujari programmes. Radio Kashmir Jammu, Srinagar, Poonch in India and seven radio stations of Pakistan and PTV air Gujari programmes and news bulletins accepted across Jammu and Kashmir. Books have been published in Gujari, including encyclopedias, poetry, fiction and non-fiction, on topics including dictionaries, grammars, nature, folklore, art and architecture, agriculture, sociology and research.

The National Academy of Letters, Sahitya Akademi, recognized Gujari as one of the major Indian languages for its National Award, Bhasha Samman, and other programmes. The Jammu and Kashmir Academy of Arts, Culture and Languages established a Gujari Department in its Central Office in the 1970s and published in Gujari. They organized seminars, conferences, etc. for the development of the Gujari Language. Jammu and Kashmir State Board of School Education made curriculum in Gujari up to Middle Standard for teaching Gujari in schools. The University of Jammu Council approved the opening of Gojri Research Centre in Jammu and University of Kashmir that have been awarded doctorate degrees on completing research projects on the language. In Pakistan administered Kashmir, the Gujari Academy has been established and postgraduate studies departments were set up in various universities and regional research centers.

Revival 
In lower or plain areas of Pakistan, Gujjars have a major concentration in districts like Islamabad, Attock, Rawalpindi, Chakwal, Jhelum, Gujrat, Sialkot, Narowal, Gujranwala, Sargodha, Faisalabad, Sheikhupura, Lahore and Layyah. However, due to the revolution of time, the majority of them have forgotten or stopped speaking Gujrai. Gojri Bahali Programme (Gojri Revival Programme) has been launched in these areas to encourage Gujjars to restart speaking Gujari. Though this programme has a particular focus on these areas, it extends to the whole of Pakistan. Under this programme, Gujjars are being persuaded to readopt Gujari as their mother language. They are also being asked to mention it in the mother language column of various forms at educational institutions; when applying for computerised national identity card; and while filling out their particulars when seeking employment. Under this programme, the federal government will be asked to add Gujari in the mother language column of the population census. Similarly, the University of Gujrat will be asked to set up Gojri Department. The programme is the initiative of Muhammad Afsar Khan, a Kundoana Gujjar from Chakdina village in Gujrat district. Kundoana Gujjars are a branch of Khatana Gujjars and trace their descent from Kundo, a famous Gujjar who lived during the reign of Mughal King Akbar or immediately before him in Gujrat district. His grave survives to date in Makiana village in Gujrat tehsil.

Bibliography 
Dictionaries :
  Gojri Dictionary 6 Volume Jammu and Kashmir Academy of Art, Culture and Languages
  Concise Gojri Dictionary Ed. Javaid Rahi, Jammu and Kashmir Academy of Art, Culture and Languages
  Hindi- Gojri Dictionary Ed. Javaid Rahi, Tribal Research and Cultural Foundation
  Folk-Lore Dictionary 2 VOL of Gujjar Tribe Ed. Javaid Rahi, Tribal Research and Cultural Foundation
  Hindi- Gojri Dictionary Ed. Javaid Rahi, Tribal Research and Cultural Foundation
  Gojri English Dictionary Ed.Dr. Rafiq Anjum

Books / Author/ Javaid Rahi
  Lok-Virso – (Research )Awarded by Jammu and Kashmir Academy of Art, Culture and Languages(1999)
  Jammu Kashmir ke Qabaila-aur-unki Zubanein (Research /Urdu) –(2010)
  Gujjar Tribe of Jammu and Kashmir (Research English) (2015)
  Gujjar Shanakhat Ka Safar (History and Culture Urdu-2005)
  Gojri Lok Geet -2018
 Gujjar Aur Gojri (2004)
 Gujjar Tarekh (2009)
 Tagore ki Chunam Shairi (2011) Published by Jammu and Kashmir Academy of Art, Culture and Languages
 Gojri Grammer (2012) Published by Jammu and Kashmir Academy of Art, Culture and Languages
 Qadeem Gojri Lughat (2013) Published by Jammu and Kashmir Academy of Art, Culture and Languages
 The Gujjar Tribe of J&K (2012) Published by Jammu and Kashmir Academy of Art, Culture and Languages
 The Gujjars vol 1 to 6 (2013–16) Published by Jammu and Kashmir Academy of Art, Culture and Languages
 The Gujjars Tribe of Jammu and Kashmir Research Book

Gujari journals 

Published by Jammu and Kashmir Academy of Art, Culture and Languages

 Sheeraza Gojri-Bi-Monthly
 Maharo Adab Gojri
 Shingran Ka Geet
 Gojri Ka Lal
 Qadawar
 Paneeri
 Gojri Look Geet
 Gojri Look Kahani
 Gujjar Aur Gojri
 Gojri Zaban-o-Adab
 
GOJRI BOOKS Published by NGOs

 Akhan Gojri Quotations JK Gojri Anjuman 2004 Edited by Dr. Rafeeq Anjum
 Gojri Kahawat Kosh Gojri Quotations JK Gojri Anjuman 2004 Edited; by Dr. Rafeeq Anjum
 Anjum Shanasi Biography JK Gojri Anjuman 2007 Edited
 Sajra Phull ( Hakeem) Selected poetry JK Gojri Anjuman 2007, Edited
 Peehng (Mukhlis) Selected poetry JK Gojri Anjuman 2007, Edited by Dr. Rafeeq Anjum
 GOJRI BOOKS Published by BAZM E ADAB KALAKOTE
 SAJAR BOOT – book series
  گوجری سیرت النبی صلی اللہ علیہ وسلم(لشکار محمد) مصنف مفتی محمد ادریس ولی ہسوال گوجر

References

1992: Rensch, Calvin R., Hindko and Gujari - National Institute of Pakistani Studies, 305 pp. .
2012: Javaid Rahi, The Gujjar Tribe of Jammu & Kashmir -Gulshan Books, Srinagar J&K 190001, 305 pp. ISBN -13|8183391030.

External links

 Dr. R.P. Khatana. Gujari Language and Identity in Jammu and Kashmir.
 Gojri Language Textbook for Class1
 Gojri Language Textbook for Class2
 Gojri Language Textbook for Class3
 Gojri Language Textbook for Class4
 Gojri Language Textbook for Class5
 Gojri Language Textbook for Class6
 Gojri Language Textbook for Class8

Indo-Aryan languages
Languages of India
Languages of Afghanistan
Languages of Jammu and Kashmir
Languages of Azad Kashmir
Languages of Khyber Pakhtunkhwa
Languages of Gilgit-Baltistan
Languages of Punjab, Pakistan
Languages of Himachal Pradesh
Gurjar
Tonal languages in non-tonal families